The University of Zabol (Danushgah-e Zabel), also known as Zabol University and UOZ, is a university based in Zabol, Iran, established in 1999.

Overview
UOZ consists of eight faculties and a research complex including three institutes and one research center.

The university has  students and 396 full-time faculty members, and offers 110 majors and minors, with courses leading to Bachelor's and Master's degrees, post-diploma programs and PhDs.

Furthermore, this university consists of the huge educational-research complex of Baqiyatallah Azam (Chahnime) in 8000 hectares, modern equipped laboratories, and an internet center unique among Iranian universities’. In this regard, University of Zabolis one of the important higher education centers in the south-eastern Iran.

Physical space limitation has remained to be one of the main problems of the university from the time it was established and has affected university activities.

In this regard and to resolve this problem, the new university campus on Zabol-Bonjar road was utilized. 
Covering 134 hectares of fields, this campus includes students’ dorms, faculty of science, faculty of arts, faculty of agriculture, university mosque, canteens; Shahid Hosseini Tabatabaee sports complex, powerhouses, electricity posts, classrooms, swimming pool, shared laboratories, ancient sport salons, etc.

Faculties

 Faculty Of Agriculture (1983)
 Faculty of Natural Resources (1999)
 Faculty Of Literature And Humanities (2000)
 Faculty of Science (2001)
 Faculty of Arts and Architecture (2001)
 Faculty of Engineering (2001)
 Faculty of Veterinary (2007)
 Faculty Of Water & Soil (2010)

Institutes
 Hamoun International Wetland Research Institute (2006)
 Institute of Agriculture (2007)
 Institute of specific livestock (2006)
 Institute of Agricultural Biotechnology (2007)

Gallery

External links
 University of Zabol
 دانشگاه زابل
Central Library

Educational institutions established in 1999
Universities in Iran
Education in Sistan and Baluchestan Province
Buildings and structures in Sistan and Baluchestan Province
1999 establishments in Iran